A honky-tonk (also called honkatonk, honkey-tonk, or tonk) is both a bar that provides country music for the entertainment of its patrons and the style of music played in such establishments. It can also refer to the type of piano (tack piano) used to play such music. Bars of this kind are common in the South and Southwest United States. Many eminent country music artists, such as Jimmie Rodgers, Loretta Lynn, Patsy Cline, Ernest Tubb, Johnny Horton, and Merle Haggard, began their careers as amateur musicians in honky-tonks.

The origin of the term "honky-tonk" is disputed, originally referring to bawdy variety shows in areas of the old West (Oklahoma, the Indian Territories and mostly Texas) and to the actual theaters showing them.

The first music genre to be commonly known as honky-tonk was a style of piano playing related to ragtime but emphasizing rhythm more than melody or harmony; the style evolved in response to an environment in which pianos were often poorly cared for, tending to be out of tune and having some nonfunctioning keys. This honky-tonk music was an important influence on the boogie-woogie piano style. Before World War II, the music industry began to refer to hillbilly music being played from Texas and Oklahoma to the West Coast as "honky-tonk" music. In the 1950s, honky-tonk entered its golden age, with the popularity of Winifred Atwell, Webb Pierce, Hank Locklin, Lefty Frizzell, Ray Price, Faron Young, George Jones, and Hank Williams.

Etymology
The origin of the term honky-tonk is unknown. The earliest known use in print is an article in the Peoria Journal dated June 28, 1874, stating, "The police spent a busy day today raiding the bagnios and honkytonks." 

There are subsequent citations from 1890 in The Dallas Morning News, 1892 in the Galveston Daily News (Galveston, Texas) (which used the term to refer to an adult establishment in Fort Worth), and in 1894 in The Daily Ardmoreite in Oklahoma, Early uses of the term in print mostly appear along a corridor roughly coinciding with cattle drive trails extending from Dallas and Fort Worth, Texas, into south central Oklahoma, suggesting that the term may have been a localism spread by cowboys driving cattle to market. The sound of honky-tonk (or honk-a-tonk) and the types of places that were called honky-tonks suggests that the term may be an onomatopoeic reference to the loud, boisterous music and noise heard at these establishments.

One theory is that the "tonk" portion of the name may have come from the brand name of piano made by William Tonk & Bros., an American manufacturer of large upright pianos (established 1881), which made a piano with the decal "Ernest A. Tonk". The Tonk brothers, William and Max, established the Tonk Bros. Manufacturing Company in 1873, so such an etymology is possible, however, these pianos were not manufactured until 1889, at which point the term seems to have already been established.

An early source purporting to explain the derivation of the term (spelled honkatonk) was an article published in 1900 by the New York Sun and widely reprinted in other newspapers. The article, however, reads more like a humorous urban (or open range) legend or fable, so its veracity is questionable.

History

An article in the Los Angeles Times of July 28, 1929, with the headline Honky-Tonk' Origin Told", which was probably in response to the Sophie Tucker movie musical, Honky Tonk (1929), reads:
 

Honky-tonks were rough establishments, providing country music in the Deep South and Southwest and serving alcoholic beverages to a working-class clientele. Some honky-tonks offered dancing to music played by pianists or small bands, and some were centers of prostitution. Katrina Hazzard-Gordon wrote that the honky-tonk was "the first urban manifestation of the jook", and that "the name itself became synonymous with a style of music. Related to the classic blues in tonal structure, honky-tonk has a tempo that is slightly stepped up. It is rhythmically suited for many African-American dance."

As Chris Smith and Charles McCarron wrote in their 1916 hit song "Down in Honky Tonk Town", "It's underneath the ground, where all the fun is found."

Origins of the establishment
Although the derivation of the term is unknown, honky tonk originally referred to bawdy variety shows in the West (Oklahoma and Indian Territories and Texas) and to the theaters housing them. The earliest mention of them in print refers to them as "variety theaters" and describe the entertainment as "variety shows". The theaters often had an attached gambling house and always a bar.

In recollections long after the frontiers closed, writers such as Wyatt Earp and E.C. Abbott referred to honky-tonks in the cowtowns of Kansas, Nebraska, and Montana in the 1870s and 1880s. Their recollections contain lurid accounts of the women and violence accompanying the shows. However, in contemporary accounts these were nearly always called hurdy-gurdy shows, possibly derived from the term hurdy-gurdy, which was sometimes mistakenly applied to a small, portable barrel organ that was frequently played by organ grinders and buskers.

As late as 1913, Col. Edwin Emerson, a former Rough Rider commander, hosted a honky-tonk party in New York City. The Rough Riders were recruited from the ranches of Texas, New Mexico, Oklahoma and Indian Territories, so the term was still in popular use during the Spanish–American War.

Music

The honky-tonk sound has a full rhythm section playing a two-beat rhythm with a crisp backbeat. Steel guitar and fiddle are the dominant instruments.

The first music genre to be commonly known as honky-tonk music was a style of piano playing related to ragtime but emphasizing rhythm more than melody or harmony; the style evolved in response to an environment in which the pianos were often poorly cared for, tending to be out of tune and having some nonfunctioning keys.

Honky-tonk music influenced the boogie-woogie piano style, as indicated by Jelly Roll Morton's 1938 record "Honky Tonk Music" and Meade Lux Lewis's hit "Honky Tonk Train Blues." Lewis recorded the latter many times from 1927 into the 1950s, and the song was covered by many other musicians, including Oscar Peterson.

The twelve-bar blues instrumental "Honky Tonk" by the Bill Doggett Combo, with a sinuous saxophone line and driving, slow beat, was an early rock and roll hit. New Orleans native Fats Domino was another honky-tonk piano man, whose "Blueberry Hill" and "Walkin' to New Orleans" were hits on the popular music charts.

In the years before World War II, the music industry began to refer to honky-tonk music played from Texas and Oklahoma to the West Coast as hillbilly music. More recently, the term has come to refer to the primary sound in country music, developing in Nashville as Western swing became accepted there. Originally, it featured the guitar, fiddle, string bass, and steel guitar (imported from Hawaiian folk music). The vocals were originally rough and nasal, as exemplified by the singer-songwriters Floyd Tillman and Hank Williams, but later developed a clear and sharp sound, such as that of George Jones and Faron Young. Lyrics tended to focus on working-class life, with frequently tragic themes of lost love, adultery, loneliness, alcoholism, and self-pity.

Copyrighted and released in 1941, "Walking the Floor Over You", by Ernest Tubb, his sixth release for Decca, helped establish the honky-tonk style and Tubb as one of its foremost practitioners. Tubb, from Crisp, Texas, was a fan of Jimmie Rodgers and fused Western swing, which had been using electric guitars for years, with other "country" sounds.

He took the sound to Nashville, where he was the first musician to play electric guitar on Grand Ole Opry. In the 1950s, honky tonk entered its golden age, with the popularity of Webb Pierce, Hank Locklin, Lefty Frizzell, Faron Young, George Jones, and Hank Williams. In the mid- to late 1950s, rockabilly (which melded honky-tonk country with rhythm and blues) and the slick country music of the Nashville sound ended honky-tonk's initial period of dominance.

The Rolling Stones' number-one single and gold record "Honky Tonk Women" (1969) was based on the sound of 1940s honky-tonk artists like Hank Williams and referred to the reputation of honky-tonk bars as centres of prostitution. In the 1970s, outlaw country's brand of rough honky-tonk was represented by artists such as Gary Stewart, Waylon Jennings, Willie Nelson, David Allan Coe, and Billy Joe Shaver.

See also
 Dive bar
 Juke joint
 List of public house topics
 The Honky Tonk Man
 Country music
 Honky

References

Bibliography

Abbott, E.C. (2000). We Pointed Them North: Recollections of a Cowpuncher. Norman: University of Oklahoma Press. .
American Dialect Society (2005). "Honkatonk (1900, from wild geese?)". American Dialect Society. Retrieved July 16, 2006.
Boyd, Jean Ann (1998). Jazz of the Southwest: An Oral History of Western Swing. Austin: University of Texas Press. .
Dary, David (1989). Cowboy Culture: A Saga of Five Centuries. University Press of Kansas. Reprint ed. .
Hunter, J. Marvin (ed.) (1993). Trail Drivers of Texas: Interesting Sketches of Early Cowboys. Austin: University of Texas Press. Reprint of 1925 edition. .
Kienzle, Rich (2003). Southwest Shuffle: Pioneers of Honky Tonk, Western Swing, and Country Jazz. New York: Routledge. .
Lake, Stuart (1994). Wyatt Earp: Frontier Marshal. Pocket. Reprint ed. .
Pierce, Bob; Ashley, Larry (1996). Pierce Piano Atlas. 10th ed. .
Shay, Anthony. Boys Night Out in Leadville. Retrieved July 16, 2006.
Tennessean Tootsies' 56th Birthday Bash October 2016

Culture of the Western United States
History of the American West
Culture of the Southern United States
Types of drinking establishment
Country music